Norwich Electric Tramways served the city of Norwich in Norfolk from 30 July 1900 until 10 December 1935.

History

The Norwich Electric Tramways company was a subsidiary of the New General Traction Company. Construction work started in June 1898 and first routes opened in July 1900. An electricity generating station was built on Duke Street to supply power for the scheme. The tram depot was on Silver Road. The network was essentially complete and fully operational by the end of 1901, but there were minor additions and changes in 1918 and 1919.

Infrastructure

The network was radial, with routes based around the hub in Orford Place . From Orford Place the lines ran along:
 Haymarket, Gentleman's Walk, Market Place, St Giles Street, Earlham Road to a terminus at the entrance to Norwich cemetery 
 Castle Meadow, Bank Plain, Redwell Street, St Andrews Street, Charing Cross, St Benedicts Street, Dereham Road to a terminus at the junction with Merton Road 
 Castle Meadow, Bank Plain, Redwell Street, St Andrews Street, Charing Cross, St Benedicts Street, Barn Road, Norwich City railway station, Station Road, Oak Street, Sussex Street, St Augustine Street, Aylsham Road to a terminus at the junction with Berners Street 
A later extension across Mousehold Heath to a munitions factory enabled a goods service between the factory and the exchange sidings at Norwich Thorpe station.
 Castle Meadow, Prince of Wales Road, Norwich railway station, Thorpe Road to a terminus at 
 Red Lion Street, St Stephens Street, Norwich Victoria railway station, Queens Road, Bracondale to a terminus for Trowse railway station at 
 Red Lion Street, St Stephens Street, Norwich Victoria railway station, Queens Road, City Road, Long John Hill to a terminus at 
 Red Lion Street, St Stephens Street, Norwich Victoria railway station, St Stephens Road, Newmarket Road to a terminus at its junction with Unthank Road at 
 Haymarket, Gentleman's Walk, Market Place, St Giles Street, Unthank Road to a terminus at its junction with Mile End Road at 

There were also some lines that were abandoned prior to 1924:
 Chapel Field Road
 King Street
 Heigham Road

There were some lines used for access only:
 Chapel Field North, Theatre Street, Rampant Horse Street
 Magpie Road

Tramcars
The fleet, in a livery of maroon and ivory, initially consisted of:
 40 Brush open top double deck tramcars
 10 open top double deck trailers

Closure
In 1933 the Eastern Counties Omnibus Company bought the tramway system and began the process of shutting it down and replacing it with motor buses. The last tram route to close, in 1935, was Newmarket Road to Cavalry Barracks.

Further reading
 Norwich Tramways, David Mackley, Middleton Press 2000, 
 Norwich and it's Trams 1900 to 1935, Frances & Michael Holmes, Norwich Heritage 2021, 
 The Tramways of East Anglia, R.C.Anderson & J.C.Gilham, LRTA,

References

External links
 A Norwich Electric Tramways cap badge.
 A Norwich Electric Tramways button.
 Norwich Electric Tramways uniformed conductor and motorman, and cap badge.
 Norwich Electric Tramways on the George Plunkett website.
 Norwich Electric Tramways on the Norwich HEART website.

See also
List of town tramway systems in the United Kingdom

Tram transport in England
History of Norwich
Transport in Norwich
Rail transport in Norfolk
3 ft 6 in gauge railways in England
1900 establishments in England
1935 disestablishments in the United Kingdom